This article lists the highest railways in the world. The table only includes non-cable passenger railways whose culminating point is over 3,000 metres above sea level, regardless of their location, gauge or type.

For simplicity, absolute elevation is the only criterion of this list, though two places at exactly the same elevation above sea level can have drastically different topographic or climatic conditions.  For example, the permanent snow line is located at sea level near the poles, at 3,000 metres in the Alps and at 6,000 metres in some areas of the Andes and the Himalayas.  The tree line also depends on latitude, thus making comparisons between elevations difficult on a world scale.  At high altitudes, snow, cold, wind and harsh weather conditions make construction and maintenance an expensive challenge.

Before the opening of the Qinghai–Tibet Railway in China, currently the highest in the world, the highest three railways were located in the Andean countries of Peru and Bolivia. In the Alps, the Jungfrau Railway has the particularity of reaching an elevation that is higher than the local snow line.

For a list by country, without elevation cutoff, see List of highest railways by country.

List

Current passenger railways

Closed railways

See also
 Bhanupli–Leh line, railway project that would be the highest in the world
 List of highest railways by country
 List of highest railways in Europe
 List of railway stations

References

External links
Infos at mikes.railhistory.railfan.net

Highest railways in the world
Railways
Railways